MSMU may refer to:
 Moscow State Mining University
 I.M. Sechenov First Moscow State Medical University
 Mount St. Mary's University (Los Angeles)
 Mount St. Mary's University